Deuterated acetone ((CD3)2CO), also known as Acetone-D6, is a form (called an isotopologue) of acetone (CH3)2CO in which the hydrogen atom ("H") is replaced with deuterium (heavy hydrogen) isotope ("D"). Deuterated acetone is a common solvent used in NMR spectroscopy.

Properties
As with all deuterated compounds, the properties of deuterated acetone are virtually identical to those of regular acetone.

Manufacture
Deuterated acetone is prepared from heavy water, D2O, by what amounts to an aldol reaction. In this case, the base used is a deuterated version of lithium hydroxide:

In order to fully deuterate the acetone, the process is repeated several times, distilling off the acetone from the heavy water, and re-running the reaction in a fresh batch of heavy water.

References

Deuterated solvents